Underwood Park is a multi-sport venue located at Rochedale, Queensland. It is home to Rochedale Rovers.

Construction
The grounds have 5 fields. Most are used for Football with 1 used for AFL and Cricket. The grounds also consist of a number of Netball Courts

References

Australian rules football grounds
Cricket grounds in Australia
Soccer venues in Queensland
Rugby league stadiums in Australia
Sports venues in Brisbane
Netball venues in Queensland